Thunderball may refer to:

Thunderball (novel), 1961 James Bond novel by Ian Fleming
Thunderball (film), 1965 film adaptation of the novel starring Sean Connery
Thunderball (soundtrack), of the 1965 film
Thunderball (comics), comics character
Thunderball (U.D.O. album), also the title song
Thunderball (band), a band at one time signed to ESL Music
Operation Thunderball, original name of Operation Entebbe, a 1976 hostage-rescue mission
Thunderball, a game (draw), introduced in 1999, in the United Kingdom's National Lottery, 
Thunderball, fictional game in sketches by comedy troupe Upright Citizens Brigade

See also
Never Say Never Again, 1983 film adaptation of the novel.
Mushroom cloud, a nuclear explosion effect, sometimes known as a 'thunderball'
Ball lightning, a reported, but controversial, atmospheric electrical phenomenon
Thunderbolt, a discharge of lightning, or a symbolic representation of it